Ataru is a TBS series is about an autistic young man with a mysterious past who helps the police solve criminal cases. It stars Masahiro Nakai in the title role and has received 19.9% TV viewership ratings.

Plot

Cast
 Masahiro Nakai as Ataru / Chokozai
 Kazuki Kitamura as Shunichi Sawa
 Chiaki Kuriyama as Maiko Ebina
 Yuta Tamamori as Sho Ebina
 Go Riju as Tatsuo Ebina
 Kaoru Okunuki as Mariko Ebina
 Kyusaku Shimada as Youji Nakatsugawa
 Tetsushi Tanaka as Reiji Atsumi
 Seiji Chihara as Hasuo Nozaki
 Yasuhi Nakamura as Koshiro Inukai
 Ken Shounozaki as Kouki Matsushima
 Kaoru Mitsumune as Yui Ishikawa
 Masaya Nakamura as Nagamasa Kuroki
 Hiromichi Miyoshi as Takashi Tamakura
 Masachika Ichimura as Chokozai’s father
 Hiroaki Murakami as Larry Inoue
 Yuta Hiraoka as Takuro Kimihara

References

External links
  
 ataru-eiga.com

Japanese drama television series
2012 in Japanese television
2012 Japanese television series debuts
2012 Japanese television series endings
Nichiyō Gekijō
Autism in television
Disability mass media
Works by Takeharu Sakurai